Route 418, also known as Ming's Bight Road, is a short  north–south highway on the Baie Verte Peninsula of Newfoundland in the Canadian province of Newfoundland and Labrador. It connects the town of Ming's Bight with Route 414 (La Scie Highway), which in turn connects it with La Scie and Baie Verte. The entire length of Route 418 is a rural two-lane highway, with no other major intersections or communities of any kind along the highway.

Major intersections

References

418